A Woman in the Ultimate is a 1913 American short drama film directed by  Dell Henderson.

Cast
 Lillian Gish as Verda
 Charles Hill Mailes as Verda's stepfather
 Henry B. Walthall as member of the Badger Gang
 Alfred Paget as member of the Badger Gang
 John T. Dillon as member of the Badger Gang
 Joseph McDermott as member of the Badger Gang

See also
 Lillian Gish filmography

External links

1913 films
American silent short films
1913 short films
1913 drama films
American black-and-white films
Silent American drama films
Films directed by Dell Henderson
1910s American films
1910s English-language films
American drama short films